Heliconia obscura is a species of plant in the family Heliconiaceae. It is native to Ecuador and Peru.  Its natural habitats are subtropical or tropical moist lowland forests and subtropical or tropical moist montane forests.

References

External links
photo of herbarium specimen at Missouri Botanical Garden, inflorescence of Heliconia obscura

obscura
Flora of Ecuador
Flora of Peru
Vulnerable plants
Taxonomy articles created by Polbot